Catalina Foothills is an unincorporated community and census-designated place (CDP) located north of Tucson in Pima County, Arizona, United States.  Situated in the southern foothills of the Santa Catalina Mountains, Catalina Foothills had a population of 50,796 at the 2010 census.  Catalina Foothills is one of the most affluent communities in Arizona and in the U.S., with the 6th highest per capita income in Arizona, and the 14th highest per capita income in the U.S. of communities with a population of at least 50,000.  The Catalina Foothills community includes some of Arizona's most expensive homes and land, and has the highest median property value. It also includes resorts, golf courses, and spas.

History
Modern development of the Catalina Foothills dates back to the early 1920s.  Prior to that time, the Catalina Foothills area was primarily federal trust land and open range for cattle grazing.  Beginning in the 1920s, John Murphey began purchasing property north of River Road in the foothills of the Santa Catalina Mountains.

Murphey originally planned to develop 10 housing subdivisions with large lots.  Murphey's vision for the Catalina Foothills community was low-density residential development, on lots designed for maximum privacy, preserving existing desert vegetation, the natural terrain, and mountain views.  In 1928 Murphey bought a  tract of land north of River Road between North Oracle Road and Sabino Canyon in a federal land auction.

Around the same time, Josias Joesler, a Swiss architect, was retained to implement John Murphey's vision.  Residential development in the Catalina Foothills began in the 1930s, and Joesler designed a number of the homes.

In 1931, residents of the Foothills organized the Catalina Foothills School District to serve the local school-aged population.  Murphey sold the school district the land for the first school building near East River Road and North Campbell Avenue, and Joesler designed the first school building.  This building continues to house the school district's administration.

In 1936, Joesler and Murphey completed the building of St. Philip's in the Hills Episcopal Church at the corner of Campbell Avenue and River Road, which was then the main entrance to the Catalina Foothills Estates,  an example of Spanish Colonial Mission architecture.  The land for the church was donated by Murphey, and Joesler donated his services for its design. The congregation paid only for construction.

The Catalina Foothills’ population continued to expand, as development continued northward on the Oracle Road corridor, and eastward along the Ina Road/Skyline Drive corridor.  In 1963, the Skyline Country Club was established.  In the 1980s, both La Paloma Resort and Ventana Canyon Resort were established.

While the Catalina Foothills community supports a population exceeding 50,000, most of the neighborhoods maintain a low-density and suburban character.

Geography
The Catalina Foothills area is defined as north of River Road, east of Oracle Road, and west of Sabino Creek.  The Catalina Foothills community is bounded to the north by the Santa Catalina Ranger District of the Coronado National Forest.

Catalina Foothills is located at  (32.293990, -110.883872).

According to the United States Census Bureau, the CDP has a total area of 44.6 square miles (115.5 km2), of which 44.5 square miles (115.2 km2)  is land and 0.1 square mile (0.3 km2)  (0.3%) is water.

Demographics

As of the census of 2000, there were 53,794 people, 23,948 households, and 15,590 families residing in the CDP. The racial makeup of the CDP was 91.4% White, 1.2% Black or African American, 0.5% Native American, 3.2% Asian, 0.1% Pacific Islander, 1.7% from other races, and 1.9% from two or more races.  7.6% of the population were Hispanic or Latino of any race.

There were 23,948 households, out of which 24.6% had children under the age of 18 living with them, 57.3% were married couples living together, 5.6% had a female householder with no husband present, and 34.9% were non-families. 28.8% of all households were made up of individuals, and 9.2% had someone living alone who was 65 years of age or older.  The average household size was 2.23 and the average family size was 2.76.

In the CDP, the population was spread out, with 19.9% under the age of 18, 6.4% from 18 to 24, 23.0% from 25 to 44, 31.8% from 45 to 64, and 19.0% who were 65 years of age or older.  The median age was 45 years. For every 100 females, there were 93.4 males.  For every 100 females age 18 and over, there were 91.0 males.

The median income for a household in the CDP was $65,657, and the median income for a family was $82,675. Males had a median income of $61,697 versus $37,077 for females. The per capita income for the CDP was $42,006.  About 2.4% of families and 4.3% of the population were below the poverty line, including 3.8% of those under age 18 and 3.2% of those age 65 or over.

Education
Catalina Foothills is served by three public school districts:
 Amphitheater Public Schools serves neighborhoods in the western Catalina Foothills, namely Pima Canyon Estates, Cobblestone Estates, and the Via Entrada neighborhood.  Amphi schools serving the Catalina Foothills perform among the top in the state academically, and include Canyon del Oro High School.  In 2007 and again in 2010, Newsweek Magazine rated Canyon del Oro in the top 5% of public schools in the U.S., one of a handful of schools in Arizona included on the list.
 Catalina Foothills School District serves the upper Catalina Foothills, with schools that score among the highest in the state on standardized tests, including Catalina Foothills High School.  Catalina Foothills High School is the only high school located in Catalina Foothills proper, and was established in 1992.  In 2006, Catalina Foothills had Arizona's second highest percentage of students exceeding math, the third highest percentage of students exceeding reading standards, and the ninth highest percentage of student exceeding writing standards on the Arizona Instrument to Measure Success (AIMS) mandatory exam.
 Tucson Unified School District serves the lower and northeastern neighborhoods of the Catalina Foothills.  TUSD schools that serve the Catalina Foothills are Jacob C. Fruchtendler Elementary School, Joseph W. Magee Middle School, Doolen Middle School, W. V. Whitmore Elementary School, Davidson Elementary School, Catalina High School, and Sabino High School.

Points of interest
Notable popular attractions in the Santa Catalina Mountains include:
 Sabino Canyon
 Bear Canyon
 Pima Canyon

The Catalina Foothills is also home to La Encantada, the largest upscale shopping center in the Tucson metropolitan area.  Stores include Tiffany & Co., Louis Vuitton, Crate & Barrel, Pottery Barn, Williams Sonoma, and Tommy Bahama.

The Catalina Foothills community forms the core of Tucson's resort corridor.  These include the Hacienda del Sol Resort, Westin La Paloma Resort, Loews Ventana Canyon Resort, Westward Look Wyndham Grand Resort, and Canyon Ranch Resort.

The Foothills area is also home to the DeGrazia Gallery in the Sun near the intersection of North Swan Road and East Skyline Drive. Built by artist Ted DeGrazia starting in 1951, the 10-acre (40,000 m2) property is listed on the National Register of Historic Places and features an eclectic chapel, an art gallery, and a free museum.

Catalina Foothills also has an unusual subdivision in Tucson, called Sin Vacas (Without Cows). According to historian David Leighton, in an article published on April 8, 2014, in the Arizona Daily Star, the land where Sin Vacas subdivision now sits was owned at one point by steel magnate William J. “Jack” Holliday who was fond of desert wildlife and fenced in his property to keep cows out, and  called it Rancho Sin Vacas (Ranch Without Cows).  Developer Kelley Rollings later came along and purchased the land and along with his Spanish speaking office manager named some of the most interesting street names in Tucson, giving many of them names related to the Seven Deadly Sins, such as Calle Sin Pecado (Street Without Sin) and Plaza Sin Lujuria (Place Without Lust).

The Tucson Arizona Temple of the Church of Jesus Christ of Latter-day Saints is in Catalina Foothills, near the intersection of Ina Road and Skyline Drive. It was completed in June 2017 and dedicated later that year in August.

See also
 Santa Catalina Ranger District
 Pusch Ridge Wilderness

References

External links
 Catalina Foothills School District
 Foothills News (newspaper)
 Catalina Foothills Association
 David Leighton, "Street Smarts: Possible typo changed name of foothills street (Hacienda Del Sol Rd.)," Arizona Daily Star, Oct. 8, 2013
 David Leighton, "Street Smarts: Foothills street name honors one of Tucson's most important builders," Arizona Daily Star, March 25, 2014
 David Leighton, "Street Smarts: Tucson's Ranch Without Cows also boasts a Street Without Sin," Arizona Daily Star, April 8, 2014
  David Leighton, "Street Smarts: Meet the man who brought orange groves to Tucson," Arizona Daily Star, June 3, 2014

Santa Catalina Mountains
Census-designated places in Pima County, Arizona
Populated places in the Sonoran Desert
Populated places established in 1928
1928 establishments in Arizona